Priory Church of St Mary, Bridlington, commonly known as Bridlington Priory Church is a parish church in Bridlington, East Riding of Yorkshire, England, in the Diocese of York. It is on the site of an Augustinian priory founded in 1113 which was dissolved during the  Dissolution of the Monasteries. In 1951 it was designated a Grade I Listed Building.

History

Foundation
Bridlington Priory was founded around 1113 by Walter de Gant, for Augustinian Canons Regular, one of the earliest Augustinian houses in England, with an adjoining convent. Its foundation was confirmed in charters by King Henry I of England The site had formerly been a Saxon church and nunnery. The first prior is thought to have been called Guicheman or Wickeman.

Early history
The priory was favoured by kings and their nobles and soon owned land across Yorkshire. The Canons from the priory established Newburgh Priory in 1145. King Stephen granted that the priory should have the right to have the property of felons and fugitives within the town and proceeds from the harbour, and later King John gave the priory the right to hold a yearly fair in the town in 1200. During the conflict between Stephen and Matilda, William le Gros, Earl of Albemarle (a Manor in Holderness which is now ‘lost’) advanced on the priory and expelled the canons in his campaign against Gilbert de Gant of Hunmanby. He fortified the priory and later gave the priory six parcels of land, one at Boynton and the rest in Holderness.  Henry IV appropriated the rectory of Scarborough to the priory which was later confirmed by Henry V, Henry VI and Edward IV. A royal licence was also granted by Richard II in 1388 to crenellate the priory with fortifications but although history tells there were four gates, 3 of those gates were in the main priory land, Kirk Gate, West Gate, Nun Gate and these were used as daily entrances in and out of the building enclosure itself. Only the Bayle Gate was a fortified entrance standing at the borders and the Priory itself was in fact never walled. The priory also had a large library, which was listed by John Leland shortly before the dissolution.

Dissolution of the Monasteries
The priory was dissolved in 1538 by Henry VIII during the Dissolution of the Monasteries. The priory was very wealthy at the time of the dissolution and its yearly income was estimated to be , and owned land stretching from Blubberhouses in the north, and Askham Richard, down to the Spurn Point.

The condition of the priory at the dissolution can be gathered from the report of Richard Pollard, a surveyor of Henry VIII. The Church was more than 390 feet in length, surrounded by the Chapter House, Treasury, Cloister, Prior's Hall, Infirmary. The quire of the mediaeval church contained woodwork by the celebrated William Brownflete (or Bromflete) who had made the stalls in Beverley Minster, Manchester Cathedral and Ripon Cathedral and a number of churches under the patronage of Lady Margaret Beaufort, including Gresford and Mold churches, and the chapel of St John's College, Cambridge. All the buildings were destroyed except the nave which became the parish church and the  gatehouse, which is now the Bayle Museum. Some of the stones from the old priory were used in the construction of the piers at Bridlington. The last Prior, William Wode, was executed at Tyburn for his part in the Pilgrimage of Grace.

Restoration
For three centuries after the dissolution, the nave continued to be used as the parish church and only a third of the building was actually used by the congregation. From 1846 the parish began to raise funds to restore the church and it was partially re-roofed; the west window was opened out and filled with stained glass; the interior was white-washed; and the east window also was filled with stained glass. This work was carried out by the Lancaster partnership of Paley and Austin, but their work was not to the satisfaction of the church authorities.  Around 1874 the church employed Sir George Gilbert Scott to completely refurbish the church as it is today. The total cost of the restoration was about £27,000.

Organ
The organ was built in 1889 by the Belgian organ builder Charles Anneessens. Various adjustments were made in the 20th century, before it was restored and enlarged between 2004 and 2006 by Nicholson. It has been recorded a number of times and is played by Daniel Moult in the film and recording Virtuoso! Music for Organ.

Organists
George Fox
William Turner 1857 – ???? (formerly organist at Pocklington)
J.W. Wilson
J E W Lord 1889–1894 (afterwards organist of St Mary's Church, Harrogate)
Arthur Edgar Perry
Arthur Charles Edwards 1896–1901
George Pattman 1901–1904 (later organist of St Mary's Cathedral, Glasgow)
Bernard Johnson 1904–1909 (afterwards organist of Albert Hall, Nottingham)
Arthur Percy Stephenson ca. 1912
Sydney Weale 1914 – 1920
Arthur Robinson 1919–1947
Eric John Fairclough 1947–1950
Mervyn John Byers 1952–1957 (afterwards organist of St Andrew's Cathedral, Sydney)
Raymond Sunderland 1957–1977
Geoffrey Pearce 1984–1987 (afterwards organist at Selby Abbey)
Michael Smith 1987–2019
Paul Dewhurst 2020-

Organ Scholars
 Charlie Leeson 2012 – 2017
 Christopher Too 2012 – 2013
 Jake Leach 2017–2019

People connected to the Priory
St John of Bridlington, English saint
Piers Langtoft who wrote a history of England in Anglo-Norman verse.
Robert of Bridlington, fourth prior and theologian
Sir George Ripley, 15th century English alchemist
Ginger Lacey, Battle of Britain fighter pilot (memorial plaque in the Priory)

See also
Grade I listed churches in the East Riding of Yorkshire
List of English abbeys, priories and friaries serving as parish churches

References

External links

 Priory stained glass from the BBC

1113 establishments in England
Religious organizations established in the 1110s
1537 disestablishments in England
Augustinian monasteries in England
Monasteries in the East Riding of Yorkshire
Church of England church buildings in the East Riding of Yorkshire
Christian monasteries established in the 12th century
Grade I listed churches in the East Riding of Yorkshire
Grade I listed monasteries
Monasteries dissolved under the English Reformation
Bridlington